Robert Dean (born October 28, 1915) was a professional baseball pitcher in the Negro leagues. He played with the St. Louis Stars in 1937 and the Indianapolis ABCs/St. Louis–New Orleans Stars from 1938 to 1940.

References

External links
 and Seamheads

St. Louis Stars (1937) players
Indianapolis ABCs (1938) players
St. Louis Stars (1939) players
St. Louis–New Orleans Stars players
1915 births
Year of death missing
Baseball pitchers
Baseball players from Oklahoma